Roncalli High School is a private, Catholic high school located in Manitowoc, Wisconsin, USA. It is owned by the Diocese of Green Bay. Founded in 1965 by the De La Salle Christian Brothers, Roncalli High School is named for Pope John XXIII (né Angelo Roncalli).  Roncalli offers a college-prep curriculum.

The school's mascot is the Jets, and its gymnasium is known as "the Hangar".  A Fine Arts Center for the visual and performing arts is the newest addition. The Zimmer Auditorium hosts four dramatic productions and six instrumental and choral concerts each year.

Roncalli's educational values are inspired by St. John Baptist de La SalleSt. Francis Of Assisi, St. Edith Stein, and Pope John XXIII.

The school offers AP classes, including AP chemistry, AP physics, AP human biology, AP U.S. history and AP calculus.

Notable alumni
Jim Schmitt, Former Mayor of Green Bay
Bob Ziegelbauer, Wisconsin politician
 Michael Zimmer, privacy and social media scholar

Notes and references

External links
Roncalli High School website

Roman Catholic Diocese of Green Bay
Educational institutions established in 1965
Catholic secondary schools in Wisconsin
Schools in Manitowoc County, Wisconsin
1965 establishments in Wisconsin